Bernard Ferdinand Lyot (27 February 1897 in Paris – 2 April 1952 in Cairo) was a French astronomer.

Biography
An avid reader of the works of Camille Flammarion, he became a member of the Société Astronomique de France  in 1915 and made his first observations using the society's telescope on rue Serpente in Paris. From graduation in 1918 until 1929, he worked as a demonstrator at the École Polytechnique and studied engineering, physics, and chemistry at the University of Paris.

From 1920 until his death he worked for the Meudon Observatory, where in 1930 he earned the title of Joint Astronomer of the Observatory. After gaining the title, he earned a reputation of being an expert of polarized and monochromatic light. Throughout the 1930s, he labored to perfect the coronagraph, which he invented to observe the corona without having to wait for a solar eclipse. Most of this work implied painstaking long observations at the Pic du Midi Observatory. It was an exceptionnally good site, free of both air pollution and light pollution but it came with a disadvantage: In the interwar period access to the peak implied mountaineering skills and physical fitness, specially in winter when access was only gained with a long and tiresome ski touring trek on sealskin-fitted skis, a technique mastered by Lyot, a keen sportsman and mountaineer. Accomodation on site can only be described as spartan, before a powerline, a bigger refuge and a cablecar were built in the early 1950's. In 1938, he showed a movie of the corona in action to the International Astronomical Union. In 1939, he was elected to the French Academy of Sciences. He became Chief Astronomer at the Meudon Observatory in 1943 and received the Bruce Medal in 1947.

Lyot was the President of the Société astronomique de France, the French astronomical society, from 1945-1947.

He suffered a heart attack while returning from an eclipse expedition in Sudan and died on 2 April 1952, at the age of 55.

Observations and Achievements on Pic du Midi
Lunar soil behaves like volcanic dust.
Mars has sandstorms.
Improved his coronagraph.
Made motion pictures of solar prominences and the corona.
Found spectral lines in the corona.

Inventions

 Coronagraph
 Lyot filter
 Lyot stop
 Lyot depolarizer

Awards and honors
Awards
 Lalande Prize from the French Academy of Sciences
 Janssen Medal from the French Academy of Sciences (1930)
 Prix Jules Janssen, the highest award of the Société astronomique de France(1932)
 Gold Medal of the Royal Astronomical Society (1939)
 Howard N. Potts Medal (1942)
 Bruce Medal (1947)
 Henry Draper Medal of the National Academy of Sciences (1951)

Named for him
 Lyot (lunar crater).
 Lyot (Martian crater).
 Minor planet 2452 Lyot.

References

1897 births
1952 deaths
Scientists from Paris
20th-century French astronomers
20th-century French inventors
Members of the French Academy of Sciences
Foreign associates of the National Academy of Sciences
Recipients of the Gold Medal of the Royal Astronomical Society
Howard N. Potts Medal recipients
Recipients of the Lalande Prize